The 2012–13 AWHL season was the second season of the American West Hockey League.  The regular season schedule ran from September 28, 2012, to March 2, 2013.

Team changes 
The Yellowstone Quake joined the AWHL from the Northern Pacific Hockey League (NorPac) as the league's seventh member.

The Glacier Nationals, a team in the Northern Pacific Hockey League, played 20 games (10 home, 10 away) against AWHL teams in order to alleviate the travel time Glacier had to make to play other teams in their league.  Glacier was the farthest east of all of the NorPac teams at the time.

Regular season

Playoffs

AWHL Semifinals
The Helena Bighorns swept the Missoula Maulers in three games to advance to the finals. The Yellowstone Quake also swept the Gillette Wild in three games to reach the finals.

AWHL Finals
The Helena Bighorns swept the Yellowstone Quake in three games to win the 2012-2013 AWHL Championship.

USA Hockey Tier III Junior National Championship
By winning the AWHL Championship, Helena earned a birth to the 2013 USA Hockey Tier III Junior National Championship in Rochester, Minnesota.
The Bighorns went 2–1 in pool play, with a 2–1 overtime win against the New Jersey Rockets of the Metropolitan Junior Hockey League, an 11–2 win over the Boch Blazers of the Eastern States Hockey League, and a 5–3 loss to the Atlanta Jr. Knights of the EJHL South. The Bighorns earned the second seed in their group and advanced to the semifinals, losing to the eventual national champion North Iowa Bulls 3–2 in the second overtime period.

References

External links
 AWHL Website
 2012-13 AWHL Schedule
 2012-13 AWHL Standings
 2013 Tier III Junior Nationals Website

AWHL season
American West Hockey League seasons